The Archaeological Museum of Gandia is a center where is shown the archaeological heritage of La Safor and Gandia area, but especially, the materials of the Parpalló cave.

In 1972, with the collaboration of the Diputación de Valencia, was officially inaugurated the Museum, now known by the acronym Maga, and is located in the old building of the Sant Marc Hospital, in the South-East end of the medieval walls of Gandia, on the left bank of the river Serpis.

The Museum was closed to the public during the period from 1987 to 2003. In this period have been conducted research, documentation and restoration of the Museum's collections. It has a permanent exhibition on the regional prehistory, from the first inhabitants of the Paleolithic to the Iron Age.

It houses parts of some of the main archaeological sites of Europe, such as the Cueva de Bolomor, the Parpalló cave and the Maravillas cave.

See also 

 Route of the Borgias
 Route of the Valencian classics

References

External links 

Website of the Archaeological Museum of Gandia

Gandia
Museums in Valencia
Route of the Borgias